The Ziwiye hoard is a treasure hoard containing gold, silver, and ivory objects, also including a few  gold pieces with the shape of human face , that was uncovered on in Ziwiyeh plat near Saqqez city in Kurdistan Province, Iran, in 1947.

Provenance
Objects from the hoard provide a link between the cultures of the Iranian plateau and the nomadic or Scythian art forms known as the "animal style". "The Scythian motives adopted by Urartu account for the decoration of the great Treasure of Saqqez brought to light on the south shore of Lake Urmia," was Leonard Woolley's assessment (Woolley 1961 p 176).

Style
The hoard contains objects in four styles: Assyrian, Scythian, proto-Achaemenid, and the provincial native pieces. Dated ca. 700 BC, this collection of objects illustrates the situation of the Iranian plateau as a crossroads of cultural highways—not least of them the Silk Road—which fused disparate cultures to inform early Iranian art. The objects have also been related to finds at Teppe Hasanlu and Marlyk.

Current location
Examples of the Ziwiye Treasure are scattered among public and private collections. A 'Ziwiye' provenance may have been applied to comparable objects that have passed through the trade since the 1960s. Items attributed to the hoard are currently in the collections of the Metropolitan Museum in New York, the Louvre in Paris and the British Museum in London.

Controversy
The archaeologist Oscar White Muscarella has questioned the whole account of the finding of the hoard (as he has done with the older Oxus Treasure), pointing out that none of the items were excavated under archaeological conditions, but passed through the hands of dealers. He concludes that "there are no objective sources of information that any of the attributed objects actually were found at Ziwiye, although it is probable that some were", and that the objects have no historical and archaeological value as a group", although many are genuine and "exquisite works of art".  In a later work Muscarella denounced several "Ziwiye" objects as modern forgeries.

Gallery

See also 
Ziwiyeh Castle
Ziviyeh District

References

Sources
Muscarella, Oscar White (1977), Archaeology, Artifacts and Antiquities of the Ancient Near East: Sites, Cultures, and Proveniences, 2013, BRILL, 9789004236691, google books, reprinted article from Journal of Field Archaeology, 1977, 4, nr. 2, "Ziwiye and Ziwiye': The Forgery of a Provenience"; google books
 Muscarella, Oscar White (2000), The Lie Became Great. The Forgery of Ancient Near Eastern Cultures. Groningen, Styx 2000, 539 p., google books
 Talbot Rice, Tamara, Ancient Arts of Central Asia, 1965, Thames & Hudson (Praeger in USA) 
Woolley, Leonard, 1961.The Art of The Middle East, including Persia, Mesopotamia and Palestine. (New York: Crown Publishers)
Porada, Edith et al., 1962. The Art of Ancient Iran : Pre-Islamic Cultures (New York: Crown) On-line excerpt
 Report of an exploratory dig at Ziwiye by the American archaeologist Robert Dyson in 1963, Penn Museum

Scythians
Archaeological discoveries in Iran
Treasure troves of Asia
Kurdistan Province
Iranian archaeological artifacts
Middle Eastern objects in the British Museum
Archaeology of the Achaemenid Empire
Gold objects
Metalwork of the Metropolitan Museum of Art
Near East and Middle East antiquities of the Louvre
Persian art
1947 in Iran
1947 archaeological discoveries
Saqqez County
Iran–United Kingdom relations
France–Iran relations
Ancient art in metal